Pierre Grey's Lakes Provincial Park  is a provincial park in Alberta, Canada, located  east of Grande Cache, on the north side of the Bighorn Highway.

A historic trading post is located in the park, adding to the attraction offered by the rainbow trout and brook trout stocked lakes. It is maintained by Alberta Tourism, Parks and Recreation  and is operated by Rocky Ridge Recreation.

Activities
Activities available in the park include:
Camping
Canoeing and kayaking
Cross-country skiing
Fishing and ice fishing
Hiking
Power boating

See also
List of provincial parks in Alberta
List of Canadian provincial parks
List of National Parks of Canada

External links

Municipal District of Greenview No. 16
Provincial parks of Alberta